TVI may refer to:

RTL-TVI, a French-language television station in Belgium
TVi (channel), a Ukrainian TV-channel
TVi (Malaysia), a Malaysian TV-channel
Tamil Vision International, a Tamil language television channel in Toronto, Canada
TeleVideo, a manufacturer of computer terminals
Televisão Independente, a Portuguese television channel
TVI Community College (now Central New Mexico Community College) in Albuquerque, New Mexico
Television interference
Television Iwate, a television company in Iwate Prefecture, Japan
Tactical vehicle intervention, a pursuit tactic by which a pursuing car can force a fleeing car to turn sideways abruptly, causing the driver to lose control and stop